The Central District of Robat Karim County is in Tehran province, Iran. At the National Census in 2006, its population was 122,046 in 31,736 households. The following census in 2011 counted 195,917 people in 54,900 households. At the latest census in 2016, the district had 291,515 inhabitants in 89,270 households.

References 

Robat Karim County

Districts of Tehran Province

Populated places in Tehran Province

Populated places in Robat Karim County